The third season of the Bulgarian television series The Masked Singer premiered on Nova on 11 September 2021 and concluded on 4 December 2021.

Hosts and panelists
Gero returned as host, but Vasil Vasilev-Zueka was replaced by Krasimir Radkov. In September 2021, it was announced Aleksandra Raeva, Azis and Vladimir Penev will return as panelists. Martina Vachkova which was a guest panelist in the previous season will be the new panelist.
	
The guest panellist in the third season is TV-host Gala (episode 5) (when Azis is absent), which was a panelist in the first season.

Contestants

Episodes

Week 1 (11 September) 
 Every contestant performed and was safe from elimination.

Week 2 (18 September) 

Guest Performance: "Фалшив герой" by Todor Kolev performed by Evgeni Budinov as "Snake."

Week 3 (25 September) 

Guest Performance: "Can You Feel the Love Tonight" by Elton John performed by Borislav Zahariev as "Golden."

Week 4 (2 October) 

Guest Performance: "Циганска сватба" by Toto H performed by Vanya Shtereva as "Baba Yaga."

Week 5 (9 October) 

Guest Performance: "Синева" by Vasil Naydenov performed by Mihail Duyzev as "Baby."

Week 6 (16 October) 

Guest Performance: "Relight My Fire" by Take That performed by Dimitar Karnev as "Bull."

Guest Performance: "Brand New Me" by Alicia Keys performed by Magi Dzhanavarova as "Bride."

Week 7 (23 October) 

Guest Performance: "I Was Made for Lovin' You" by Kiss performed by Ivaylo Zahariev as "Knight."

Guest Performance: "Canción del Mariachi" by Antonio Banderas performed by Evgeni Minchev as "Star."

 The performance of the "Rabbit" is presented by the participant's home because it is under quarantine.

Week 8 (30 October) 

Guest Performance: "Bella Ciao" by Manu Pilas performed by Maria Ilieva as "Scarecrow."

Week 9 (6 November) 

Guest Performance: "Poison" by Alice Cooper performed by Ivaylo Tsvetkov "Noyzi" as "Scotsman."

Week 10 (13 November) 

 
Guest Performance: "Afterglow" by Ed Sheeran performed by Katsi Vaptsarov as "Hat."
 
 The performance of the "Rhino" is shown on record.

Week 11 (20 November) 

 
Guest Performance: "We Are The World" by USA for Africa performed by Divna as "Angel."
 
Guest Performance: "Yellow Submarine" by The Beatles performed by Bogdana Trifonova as "Macaron."

Week 12 (27 November) 
 Each contestant performed two songs. 

 
Guest Performance: "Ти дойде" by Lili Ivanova performed by Marian Bachev as "Eyes."

Week 13 (4 December) - Finale 
Each contestant performed two songs, and performed a group song together, before being unmasked. 
 

Guest Performance: "Fly Me To The Moon" by Frank Sinatra performed by Bashar Rahal as "Owl."   
 
Guest Performance: "We Are the Champions" by Queen performed by Desi Dobreva as "Princess."

Group Number (Finalists): "Bad Romance" by Lady Gaga/"Rasputin" by Majestic & Boney M.

Men in Black Performance: "I Want It That Way" by Backstreet Boys

New Year's concert  (31 December)

References 

2021 Bulgarian television seasons
Bulgaria